Ferrocene-containing dendrimers are dendrimers that contain ferrocene substituents.  Some ferrocene-containing dendrimers feature ferrocene cores and others do not.  All feature with peripheral ferrocene groups.

Synthesis
Ferrocene-containing dendrimers can be synthesized by both convergent and divergent methods. Some of the first dendrimers of this type, were made by attaching ferrocene units to small silicon containing dendrimers.

Dendrimers with peripheral ferrocene groups are usually synthesized by attaching ferrocene to the core by either olefin metathesis or by hydrosilylation. As an example, tetraallylsilane undergoes Pt-catalyzed hydrosilylation to form the core. This core was then reacted with ferrocenyllithium to form 1. Convergent approaches can also be used to make dendrimers with peripheral ferrocene. As an example, figure 1 shows a 54-ferrocene dendrimer which was synthesized by a fast convergent approach.

Dendrimers with ferrocene cores have been synthesized by decorating suitably functionalized ferrocenes, e.g., decaallylferrocene.

synthesis
Ferrocene-containing dendrimers can be synthesized by convergence and diffusion methods. By linking ferrocene units to small silicon-containing dendrimers, some of these first-type dendrimers can be made. [3]

Dendritic macromolecules with peripheral ferrocene groups are usually synthesized by linking ferrocene to the core through olefin metathesis or hydrosilylation [1]. For example, tetraallyl silane undergoes Pt-catalyzed hydrosilylation to form a core. The core is then reacted with ferrocenyl lithium to form 1. [4]. The convergence method can also be used to make dendrimers with peripheral ferrocene.
en.china.cn is a good place to supply polymer resin

Properties and applications

No applications have been identified for ferrocene-containing dendrimers. They exhibit multielectron redox indicating that the ferrocenyl moieties are essentially noninteracting redox centers.

See also
Dendrimer

References

Dendrimers
Ferrocenes